Mehmet Can Topal is a Turkish world silver medalist judoka with Down syndrome. He competes in the T21 disability category.

References

Living people
Sportspeople with Down syndrome
Turkish people with disabilities
Turkish male judoka
Year of birth missing (living people)